E. inornatus may refer to:
 Epicrates inornatus, a snake species
 Erigeron inornatus, a plant species
 Euoplos inornatus, a spider species in the genus Euoplos

See also
 Inornatus